Zemire en Azor is a 1784 semi-opera, a musical play "with spectacles and a ballet" by Bartholomeus Ruloffs. It is one of the most successful attempts to create a Dutch-language opera in the 18th century. Zemire en Azor was, for its time, a box-office success, with thirteen performances. Ruloffs composed new music to a Dutch libretto, which had been translated from French.

References

Dutch-language operas
1784 operas